Arnisdale is a hamlet in the historic county of Inverness-shire in the local authority area of  Highlands of Scotland. It lies on the north shore of Loch Hourn, around  down a single-track road from Glenelg. It has a permanent population of around 30 and several holiday cottages. At the end of the village is a large white-painted hunting lodge called Arnisdale House, built by architects Robert John Macbeth & Alexander Ross in 1898-1916. The house was built for Valentine Fleming of the banking family (father of the writer and explorer Peter Fleming and of Ian Fleming, creator of James Bond), who was killed in action in World War I, a year after the house was completed. 

Arnisdale is in the Highland Council area.

Attractions
The village is most famous as the closest settlement to Camusfeàrna, the house in which Gavin Maxwell wrote the auto-biographical story of his secluded life with his pet otters, Ring of Bright Water. Terry Nutkins (1946 – 2012) the naturalist, television presenter and author, who had in his boyhood been one of Maxwell's otter keepers, lived at the end of his life near the village.

It was also the departure point during the summer months for the ferry to the Barrisdale on Knoydart, across Loch Hourn, until the ferry stopped operating in 2011. Walkers often come to Arnisdale to climb Beinn Sgritheall.

2012 Badger Incident
On the 31 October 2012, it was reported that group of badgers living under Arnisdale Free Church were responsible for digging up the ground around the graves in the 130-year-old burial ground in the  centre of the village. No human remains were thought to have been disturbed.

See also
Arnisdale Free Church

References

External links
 Arnisdale Ceilidh House Website
 The Glenelg and Arnisdale Development Trust

Populated places in Lochalsh